Euphorbia revoluta is a species of euphorb known by the common name threadstem sandmat. It is native to Mexico and the southwestern United States from California to the Rocky Mountains. It is an annual herb producing thin, erect stems with pairs of linear leaves, each leaf up to 2.6 centimeters long. The inflorescence is a cyathium with rounded nectar glands surrounding one female flower and several male flowers. There are sometimes white petal-like appendages as well. The Navajo used this plant as a skin lotion.

References

External links

CalFlora Database: Chamaesyce revoluta (rolled leaf spurge,  threadstem sandmat)
Jepson Manual Treatment of Euphorbia revoluta
USDA Plants Profile for Chamaesyce revoluta (threadstem sandmat)
Chamaesyce revoluta — UC Photos gallery

revoluta
Flora of Northeastern Mexico
Flora of Northwestern Mexico
Flora of the Southwestern United States
Flora of California
Flora of New Mexico
Flora of Texas
Flora of the Chihuahuan Desert
Flora of the Sonoran Deserts
Flora of the California desert regions
Natural history of the Colorado Desert
Natural history of the Mojave Desert
Natural history of the Peninsular Ranges
Plants used in traditional Native American medicine
Flora without expected TNC conservation status